is a Japanese professional baseball player. He was born on August 26, 1988. He debuted in 2010. He had 9 runs in 2013.

References

Living people
1988 births
People from Tokyo
Japanese expatriate baseball players in the United States
Nippon Professional Baseball outfielders
Chiba Lotte Marines players
Hokkaido Nippon-Ham Fighters players
North Shore Honu players